The Season 2007/08 of the First Division of Venezuela (officially, by reasons of sponsorship Glass CANTV) initiated  on 4 August 2007 with the participation of 18 teams, this afterwards of the promotion of 8 teams after the expansion of the league approved by the Venezuelan Federation of Football. In the season 2007/08 arrived  to the record of assistance to the stadiums of Venezuelan football to 740.000 people in a local tournament.

The winner of each one of the tournaments (Opening 2007 and Closure 2008) obtains a direct contingent to the Glass Libertadores 2009. In addition to these two contingents, the following team positioned in the Table Accumulated of all the Season 2007/08 obtains a contingent to the previous round of the Glass Libertadores of America 2009 whereas the team that follow him to east obtains one of the two contingents of Venezuela to the Glass Sudamericana 2008.

The two last teams positioned in the Table Accumulated of the Season 2007/08 descend to the Second Division of Venezuela.

Teams participants 
The teams participants in the Season 2007/08 of the First Division of the Venezuelan Football are the following:

Tournament Opening 
The Tournament Opening 2007 is the first tournament of the Season 2007/08 in the First Division of Venezuela.

Classification

Tournament Closure 
The Tournament Closure 2008 is the second tournament of the season 2007/08 in the First Division of Venezuela.

Classification 

Legend: PTS (Points), JJ (Games played), JG (Games Won), JE (Games Empatados), JG (Stray Games), GF (Goals in favour), GC (Goals against), DG (Difference of Goals).

Final

Sportive Táchira FC

Champion

Accumulated

Classification 

The Aragua FC finds  classified to the Glass Sudamericana 2008 when having  topped champion of the Glass Venezuela 2007

Legend: PTS (Points), JJ (Games played), JG (Games Won), JE (Games Empatados), JG (Stray Games), GF (Goals in favour), GC (Goals against), DG (Difference of Goals).

Top 5 Goleadores

Recognitions

Resulted 
Official "results" of the Tournament Opening (To) and the Tournament Closure (C) of the First Venezuelan Division of Football 2007/08. The rows correspond to the games of local whereas the columns correspond to the games of visitor of each one of the teams. The in colour blue results correspond to victory of the local team, red to victory visitor and yellow to tie.

References 

Venezuelan Primera División seasons
2007 in association football
2008 in association football
2007 in Venezuela
2008 in Venezuela